"Zabadak!" is a song by British musical group Dave Dee, Dozy, Beaky, Mick and Tich, written by Ken Howard and Alan Blaikley. It was released as a single in September 1967, peaking at number 3 on the UK Singles Chart and becoming the group's only single to chart on the Billboard Hot 100, peaking at number 52.

The song uses pseudo-African style percussion (created in the studio by the group) and a nonsense lyric, or likely DRUM BAND COMMANDS, in its repetitive chorus, to highlight the meaning of its two verses (sung in English). This use of an African motif was typical of the group's dabbling with other world styles of music, such as the Latin style of "Save Me" and the Greek style of "Bend It!"

Reception
Reviewing for New Musical Express, Derek Johnson described "Zabadak" as "loaded with appeal and yet completely different from anything they have previously waxed. The basic influences are a blend between Afro-Cuban and Peruvian Incan. Add to this a catchy and continually-repeated chorus, some very attractive counter-harmonies, a pulsing beat with throbbing conga drums, and a lush string section in the background – plus a haunting tune that nags at the brain – and you've got a Hit". Billboard wrote that this "African flavored rhythm item has much of the feel of "Pata Pata". In a guest column for Disc and Music Echo, Radio Caroline DJ Johnnie Walker praised "Zabadak!" as "a well-produced record and a different sound".

Track listing
7": Fontana / TF 873
 "Zabadak!" – 3:35
 "The Sun Goes Down!" – 2:48

7": Star-Club / 148 595 STF (Germany)
 "Zabadak" – 3:35
 "Nose for Trouble" – 4:01

Charts

Cover versions 
 In 1967, German pianist Horst Jankowski released an instrumental version of the song on his album And We Got Love.
 In 1967, British band The Sorrows released an Italian-language version of the song as a single only in Italy.
 In 1979, German band Saragossa Band released a cover of the song as a single, which peaked at number 6 in Germany and number 8 in Austria.
 In 1980, German organist Franz Lambert released an instrumental version on his album Pop-Orgel-Hit-Parade 6.
 In 2000, Czech band Těžkej Pokondr released a Czech-language version, titled "Zabávať", on their album Ježek v peci.
In 2008, German band beFour included a version on their album We Stand United

References

British songs
Songs written by Alan Blaikley
Songs written by Ken Howard (composer)
1967 songs
1967 singles
Fontana Records singles
RPM Top Singles number-one singles
Song recordings produced by Steve Rowland